The 1918 Mineola Aviation Station football team represented the United States Army aviators stationed at Mineola Aviation Station on Long Island during the 1918 college football season.

Laurence Bankart, a former Colgate football coach, was placed in charge of the Mineola aviators. He initially opposed football for his men, arguing that they could not risk injuries to their noses. Lawson Robertson, a noted track coach, was placed in charge of training.

The Spanish flu pandemic also resulted in the cancellation of many football games in October 1918. Sources indicate that Mineola had planned games with Camp Devens and Harvard, but no record has been found of those games having been played.

Schedule

References

Mineola Aviation Station
College football winless seasons
Mineola Aviation Station football